Knute Township is a township in Polk County, Minnesota, United States. It is part of the Grand Forks-ND-MN Metropolitan Statistical Area. The population was 496 at the 2000 census.

Knute Township bears the name of Knute Nelson, a county official.

Geography

Demographics
As of the census of 2000, there were 496 people, 168 households, and 121 families residing in the township.  The population density was 15.7 people per square mile (6.1/km2).  There were 272 housing units at an average density of 8.6/sq mi (3.3/km2).  The racial makeup of the township was 97.18% White, 1.81% Native American, and 1.01% from two or more races.

There were 168 households, out of which 26.8% had children under the age of 18 living with them, 63.1% were married couples living together, 6.5% had a female householder with no husband present, and 27.4% were non-families. 25.0% of all households were made up of individuals, and 8.9% had someone living alone who was 65 years of age or older.  The average household size was 2.42 and the average family size was 2.89.

In the township the population was spread out, with 21.2% under the age of 18, 2.2% from 18 to 24, 19.0% from 25 to 44, 27.4% from 45 to 64, and 30.2% who were 65 years of age or older.  The median age was 52 years. For every 100 females, there were 93.8 males.  For every 100 females age 18 and over, there were 87.1 males.

The median income for a household in the township was $41,750, and the median income for a family was $45,000. Males had a median income of $33,750 versus $18,750 for females. The per capita income for the township was $16,795.  About 5.3% of families and 7.4% of the population were below the poverty line, including 15.0% of those under age 18 and none of those age 65 or over.

References

Townships in Polk County, Minnesota
Townships in Minnesota